Kevin Pietersen is an English cricketer and former captain of the England cricket team. He has scored centuries (100 or more runs in a single innings) in Test and One Day International (ODI) matches, on twenty-three and nine occasions respectively. As of 1 January 2013, Pietersen has played 104 Tests and 136 ODIs for England, scoring 8,181 and 4,440 runs respectively and is the first batsman to reach 5,000 or more runs in Test cricket in under five years. His performances in the 2005 Ashes series led to Pietersen being named one of five Wisden Cricketers of the Year for 2006 and being appointed a Member of the Order of the British Empire (MBE) in the 2006 New Year Honours.

Pietersen made his Test debut against Australia in July 2005, when he was called into the team to replace Graham Thorpe for the first Test of the 2005 Ashes series. He made his first century during the fifth Test of the series at The Oval; his 158 in the third innings enabled England to draw the match and win the series 2–1. His career best score of 227 also came against Australia in the second Test of the 2010–11 Ashes series at the Adelaide Oval. Pietersen has scored centuries against all Test cricket playing nations, with the exception of Bangladesh and Zimbabwe. He is most successful against India, against whom he has scored six centuries. He is joint twenty-third among all-time Test century makers, and second in the equivalent list for England.

Pietersen made his ODI debut in 2004 against Zimbabwe at the Harare Sports Club. His first century was against South Africa at Goodyear Park, Bloemfontein in February 2005. His highest ODI score is 130 against Pakistan in February 2012 at the DSC Cricket Stadium, Dubai. Pietersen played 37 Twenty20 International (T20I) matches since his debut in 2005, without scoring a century. His highest score in the format was 79 against Zimbabwe, in September 2007.

Key

Test centuries

ODI centuries

Notes

A.  Pietersen is joint twenty-third in all-time Test century makers along with Hashim Amla, Justin Langer, Javed Miandad and Virender Sehwag.

References

External links
 Player Profile: Kevin Pietersen from ESPNcricinfo
 Player Profile: Kevin Pietersen from CricketArchive

Pietersen
Pietersen, Kevin